Ghafurabad (also Romanized as Ghafūrābād) is a village in Sanjabad-e Sharqi Rural District, in the Central District of Khalkhal County, Ardabil Province, Iran. At the 2006 census, its population was 98, in 21 families.

References 

Towns and villages in Khalkhal County